Mar Dinkha IV (Classical Syriac:  and ), born Dinkha Khanania (15 September 1935 – 26 March 2015) was an Eastern Christian prelate who served as the 120th Catholicos-Patriarch of the Assyrian Church of the East. He was born in the village of Darbandokeh (Derbendoki), Iraq and led the Church in exile in Chicago for most of his life.

Personal life
Dinkha Khanania was born in Iraq and baptized in the Church of Mar Qaryaqos located in the village of his birth, Darbandokeh. Khanania (also written as "Denkha Kh'nanya") gained his elementary education under the tutorship of his grandfather, Benyamin Soro. In 1947—at the age of eleven—he was entrusted to the care of Mar Yousip Khnanisho, Metropolitan and the Patriarchal representative for all Iraq, the second-highest-ranking ecclesiastic of the Assyrian Church of the East. After two years of study, he was ordained deacon in the church of Mar Youkhana in Harir by Mar Yousip on 12 September 1949. On 15 July 1957, he was ordained to the priesthood, and appointed to minister Urmia, Iran. He was the fourth in the line of succession to the Bishopric of Urmia.

Mar Dinkha's priesthood as Metropolitan of Iran and Tehran reestablished a line of succession which had ceased to exist after the 1915 assassination of his predecessor. In 1962, Mar Dinkha moved from northern Iraq to Tehran. During his tenure in Iran, he established a seminary and advocated for Assyrian nationalism and ecumenism. Responding to popular demand, Catholicos-Patriarch Shimun XXI Eshai consecrated Mar Dinkha as bishop on 11 February 1962, in the church of Martyr Mar Gewargis in Tehran.

Mar Dinkha died on 26 March 2015 in Rochester, Minnesota.

Tenure as Catholicos-Patriarch
After the assassination of Mar Shimun XXI Eshai, the Church of the East had an urgent need to restore its leadership. In 1976, the prelates of the church convened in London to elect a new Catholicos Patriarch and chose Mar Dinkha as the most qualified candidate to fill the post. He was consecrated on 17 October 1976, in the West London Church of St. Barnabas, Ealing. With this consecration, Mar Dinkha IV became the successor to the Apostolic see of Seleucia-Ctesiphon (Babylon). He also announced that the hereditary line of succession for the Patriarchy which had existed for 500 years was discontinued with his tenure, allowing any cleric from the Church of the East to be elevated to Catholicos-Patriarch.

Dinkha established headquarters—along with four other houses of worship—in Chicago, Illinois, United States, in part due to the instability of the Iran–Iraq War. This conflict as well as Saddam Hussein's policy of Arabization in Iraq, the Gulf War and subsequent sanctions against Iraq intensified the Assyrian diaspora from the region. Meanwhile, the Islamic Revolution and Shia emphasis in Iran created a tense situation for Assyrians in the Middle East. During the reign of Shimun XXI and Dinkha IV, American membership in the Church of the East rose from 3,200 in the 1950s to approximately 100,000 in 2008.

In 2005, the Patriarch conducted discussions with President of Iraqi Kurdistan Masoud Barzani on returning to the Apostolic See in northern Iraq and constructing a new residence in Ankawa. On 15 July 2007, Mar Dinkha celebrated 50 years of his priesthood. A ceremony was held at St. George Cathedral in Chicago, where a portion of Ashland Avenue was renamed "His Holiness Mar Dinkha IV Blvd". In 2008, he received an honorary degree from the University of Chicago, in part because of his emphasis on education—he stated a goal of only appointing theologians with doctoral degrees to the position of bishop.

Travels and ecumenism
Dinkha made ecumenism a priority during his reign, as well as advocacy for the Assyrian people.

Relations with the Catholic Church
Dinkha promoted closer relations with the Catholic Church, both with the Vatican and the Chaldean Catholic Church; he first met Pope John Paul II immediately after the Pope's election in 1978 and made his first visit to the Vatican in 1984. The two continued to meet informally over the next decade. After a decision by the Holy Synod of the Assyrian Church of the East to have better relations with the Roman Catholic Church in 1994, Dinkha agreed to a Joint Christological Declaration with the Holy See. The "Common Christological Declaration Between the Catholic Church and the Assyrian Church of the East" declares that it is "[a] basic step on the way towards the full communion to be restored between their Churches;" emphasized common doctrinal positions between the two bodies, such as the Nicene Creed; and clarifies that the centuries the two have spent out of communion were due to geographic and cultural issues rather than doctrinal differences.

On 29 November 1996, Dinkha signed an agreement of cooperation with the Patriarch of Babylon of the Chaldean Catholic Church—Raphael I Bidawid—in Southfield, Michigan and met again on 16 August 1997, to bless an Assyrian church. This "Joint Synodal Decree for Promoting Unity" also established a Joint Commission for Unity which helped draft the 2001 "Guidelines for Admission to the Eucharist between the Chaldean Church and the Assyrian Church of the East" that allows Assyrians and Chaldeans to accept the Eucharist from one another. The prior year, Assyrians and Roman Catholics also produced "A Common Statement on Sacramental Life" that assessed the importance of sacraments in both churches. Assyrians have also been allowed to study at Baghdad's Chaldean Catholic College and unmarried deacons and priests can study at Catholic universities in Rome.

Middle Eastern and Syriac ecumenism
The Church of the East has been a member of the World Council of Churches since its 1948 inception and Dinkha used this membership as a vehicle for bi- and multi-lateral ecumenism that would have been impossible prior to its inception. In 1984, the Assyrian Church applied for membership in the Middle East Council of Churches (MECC), but was denied due to objections by the Coptic Orthodox Church of Alexandria, whose Patriarch, Pope Shenouda III, required the Church of the East to condemn its Church Fathers Diodore of Tarsus, Nestorius, and Theodore of Mopsuestia. The dispute between the Assyrians and Copts resulted in a common Christological declaration in 1996, which was later rejected by the Coptic synod. In 1996, the Church of the East was offered membership in the MECC, but declined to join at the time. Discussions for the Church of the East to join the MECC have stalled since 1999.

The Austrian Pro Oriente Foundation brought together several Syriac churches in Vienna in 1994 to start a common dialogue amongst the Ancient Church of the East, the Assyrian Church of the East, Chaldean Catholic Church, Indian (Malankara) Orthodox Church, Maronite Church, Syriac Catholic Church, Syriac Orthodox Church, Syro-Malabar Catholic Church, and Syro-Malankara Catholic Church. Representatives of these churches along with academics founded the Commission on Dialogue Within the Syriac Tradition. Consultations have been convened intermittently since that time. As a product of this process, Dinkha entered into negotiations with the Syriac Orthodox Patriarch Mar Ignatius Zakka I Iwas in 1997 and the two churches ceased anathematizing each other. Although Dinkha spent over 20 years in dialogue with the Ancient Church of the East, the two remain out of communion. In 1995, the Indian metropolitan see pledged its allegiance to Dinkha, leaving the Ancient Church primarily active in the Middle East, with some 50,000–70,000 members. In 1999, Dinkha declared that all ordinations and orders from the Ancient Church were valid.

Political work and Assyrian advocacy
In September 2006, Mar Dinkha IV paid a historic visit to northern Iraq to give oversight to the churches there and to encourage the president of Iraqi Kurdistan to open a Christian school in Erbil. During this trip, he also met Iraqi President Jalal Talabani and Prime Minister Nouri al-Maliki. Dinkha pursued a pragmatic political course, calling on Assyrians to work together with their respective governments. He sought to de-politicize the office of Catholicos-Patriarch and expanded the church's outreach to the youth by including non-Syriac liturgies composed in local languages.

See also
List of patriarchs of the Church of the East

References

Sources

External links
 Official site of the Assyrian Church of the East
 His biography from the Church of the East in India

1935 births
2015 deaths
20th-century archbishops
21st-century archbishops
American bishops
Catholicos Patriarchs of the Assyrian Church of the East
People in Christian ecumenism
Iraqi Assyrian people
Iraqi Christians
20th-century bishops of the Assyrian Church of the East
Iraqi emigrants to the United States
Iraqi refugees
People from Erbil Governorate
Refugees in the United States
People from Chicago
21st-century bishops of the Assyrian Church of the East
20th-century American clergy
21st-century American clergy